Eureka, also known as Eureka O'Hara and Eureka!, is the stage name of Eureka D. Huggard (born August 26, 1990), an American drag queen and reality television personality. Eureka rose to prominence competing on the ninth and tenth seasons of RuPaul's Drag Race. She was removed from the ninth season due to a knee injury, becoming the first contestant in the history of the show to be sent home due to injury; she was then given an automatic berth to season 10, where she placed as runner-up. In 2021, Eureka competed on the sixth season of RuPaul's Drag Race All Stars, where she once more placed as a runner-up.

Since 2020, Eureka has co-hosted We're Here on HBO alongside fellow Drag Race contestants Bob the Drag Queen and Shangela. The series has received acclaim from critics.

Early life and education
Huggard was born August 26, 1990, in Bristol, Tennessee, and started performing in drag at the club New Beginnings. She chose the drag name Eureka for its phonetic similarity to their mother's given name, Ulrike, and the last name O'Hara from the Gone with the Wind character Scarlett O'Hara.

Eureka's drag mother is Jacqueline St. James, a former winner of the Miss Gay USofA at Large competition. Eureka won the National title for anti-bullying organization as Miss Don't H8 DIVA and was awarded Hall of Fame. Prior to her appearance on RuPaul's Drag Race, Eureka had participated in the drag pageantry system. She withdrew from East Tennessee State University to compete on the show.

Career

RuPaul's Drag Race 
Eureka has competed on the ninth and tenth seasons of RuPaul's Drag Race and on the sixth season of RuPaul's Drag Race All Stars. She also competed on the RuPaul's Drag Race Holi-slay Spectacular.

On February 2, 2017, it was announced that Eureka was selected alongside thirteen other contestants to compete on season nine of RuPaul's Drag Race. She was removed from the competition in episode five due to a torn ACL from the episode two challenge, making her the first contestant in the history of RuPaul's Drag Race to leave due to an injury. She received physical therapy before returning to compete on the show's tenth season in 2018. During this season, Eureka won two main challenges (in episodes five and six) and also had to lip sync for her life twice. Eureka ultimately finished as a runner-up of season 10, alongside Kameron Michaels and behind eventual winner Aquaria.

After competing on season 10, Eureka continued to work prominently as a drag queen in the entertainment industry. She starred in the music video for country singer Brandon Stansell's song "For You", released in July 2018. In September 2018, she gave a drag makeover to Zachary Quinto for Them's makeover series Drag Me. In December 2018, Eureka competed in the television special RuPaul's Drag Race Holi-slay Spectacular. In 2019, she appeared as a guest for the first challenge in the premiere of season 11 of Drag Race.

In June 2021, Eureka was revealed to be one of the thirteen cast members of the sixth season of RuPaul's Drag Race All Stars. After failing to win any main challenges but remaining safe throughout the season, Eureka was voted out by her competitors at the top five, but subsequently won re-entry into the competition after winning a lip sync battle against Silky Nutmeg Ganache. Upon returning to the competition, Eureka won the next main challenge (episode 11) and a $25,000 cash prize. In the season finale, Eureka once again placed as a runner-up alongside Ginger Minj and Ra'Jah O'Hara, losing out to eventual winner, Kylie Sonique Love.

We're Here 
Since 2020, Eureka has co-hosted We're Here on HBO alongside fellow Drag Race contestants Bob the Drag Queen and Shangela. In the series, the trio of drag queens travel across the United States to recruit small-town residents to participate in one-night-only drag shows. After premiering on April 23, 2020, the series was renewed for a second season, which premiered on October 11, 2021. In December 2021, the series was renewed for a third season. The series has received acclaim from critics.

Music

In April 2017, O'Hara and Adam Barta premiered a single and music video for "Body Positivity", which features Kandy Muse, a drag queen from the Haus of Aja who would later go on to compete on season 13 of Drag Race. The video features cameo appearances by RuPaul's Drag Race contestants Charlie Hides and Cynthia Lee Fontaine, as well as reality television personality Farrah Abraham. "Body Positivity (part ii: Electropoint)" was released in March 2018.

Eureka released her first solo single, "Stomp", on April 28, 2017. She released their second solo single, "The Big Girl", co-written by Bob the Drag Queen, on June 28, 2018. The accompanying music video has been viewed more than two million times on YouTube.

As part of the final challenge of season 10 of RuPaul's Drag Race, O'Hara and the other top four contestants wrote and recorded their own verses for RuPaul's song "American". The song reached number 12 on the Billboard Dance/Electronic Songs chart. In November 2018, VELO released the single "Where My Man At", featuring O'Hara and Drag Race season three runner-up Manila Luzon. The two also appear in the song's music video, together with Thorgy Thor, Ginger Minj, and Trinity the Tuck.

Personal life
Eureka lived as a trans woman for about five years before deciding to detransition. She then identified as "genderfluid and gender-neutral" and used they/them pronouns out of drag. On the season 3 finale of We're Here, Eureka came out as a trans woman, using exclusively she/her pronouns and beginning to both socially and medically transition.  Eureka supports body positivity and has nicknamed herself "The Elephant Queen". She cites Divine as an influence to her drag aesthetic. Huggard came out again as a trans woman in December 2022.

Discography

Filmography

Television

Web series

Music videos

Awards and nominations

See also
 List of people with non-binary gender identities

References

External links
 
 
 

1990 births
Living people
American drag queens
East Tennessee State University alumni
LGBT people from Tennessee
People from Johnson City, Tennessee
People who detransitioned
Eureka O'Hara
Non-binary drag performers
RuPaul's Drag Race All Stars contestants
Transgender women
Genderfluid people